Peter Ludwig Graf von der Pahlen (Palms Manor, Palms (now ) – , Mitau (now )), a Baltic-German courtier and general, played a pivotal role in the assassination of Emperor Paul of Russia in 1801. He became a general in the Imperial Russian Army in 1798, a count in 1799, and served as the Military Governor of St. Petersburg from 1798 to 1801.

Early career

Pahlen stemmed from a family of Baltic nobles. He was born in the manor of Palms, in present-day Haljala Parish, Lääne-Viru County, Estonia. He served in the horse guards and saw service in the Russo-Turkish Wars. He was wounded at Bendery and invested with the Order of St George of the 4th degree. During the Russo-Turkish War, 1787-92 he distinguished himself during the Siege of Ochakov (order of St. George the 3rd degree).

In 1787 Pahlen was put in charge of the Riga Governorate. He conducted the negotiations leading to the incorporation of Courland, Semigalia, and other Biron possessions into the Russian Empire. After that, he was appointed the first  Governor General of Courland Guberniya (1795).

Paul's reign

On December 3, 1796 Pahlen was appointed to command the Cuirassier Regiment of Riga, but soon the new Emperor made him regret his former contacts with the disgraced prince Platon Zubov. In January 1797 Pahlen was discharged from the governorship, and on 26 February he was relieved from his post in the regiment and excluded from the service.

However, he was soon again accepted into active service and appointed as Inspector of the Cavalry and the commander of the Household Troops of Horse Regiment. He was rapid in acquiring the sovereign's confidence. Enjoying the unlimited favor of Pavel I, for three years (1798–1801) he served as the military governor of Saint Petersburg, the governor of the Baltic provinces,  the inspector of 6 military districts, the Grand Chancellor of the Maltese order, the chief director of mail, a member of the Imperial Council and of the Board of Foreign Affairs.

During his time in office the building of St Michael's Castle and of the Naval Military School was completed. The Field of Mars was graced with monuments honoring Field Marshal Rumyantsev and Alexander Suvorov. The Imperial iron foundry was transferred from Kronstadt to Petersburg and Nikolai Rezanov founded the Russian-American Company.

Conspiracy and regicide

In August 1800 Pahlen was discharged from his governorship, only to be reappointed on October 21. Seeing how fragile his position was, he joined the conspirators plotting against the emperor in the house of Olga Zherebtsova. Together with Nicholas Zubov he was one of plot's leaders and organizers. In the plot he played a dual role, trying in the case of failure to 
conceal his participation.

He extracted from the emperor the written order to arrest his son and heir, Alexander Pavlovich, and showed this to him in order to overcome his fluctuation in the plot. He was present during Paul's strangling on the night of March 12, 1801. After the assassination he acquired an irreconcilable enemy in the Empress Maria Feodorovna who prevented him from occupying any important post under Alexander's reign. On 1 April 1801, he was discharged from the service and ordered to withdraw into his estates in Courland. Pahlen died in Mitau on February 13, 1826.

Pahlen in film
In 1908 Dmitry Merezhkovsky wrote the play Pavel I, which enjoyed limited popularity in Russia. In 2003 the director Vitaly Melnikov adapted the play into the movie Poor Poor Paul. In contrast to the play, the accent in the film is made not only on the fate of Pavel I, but also on Pahlen's role in the plot against him. Pahlen is seen as the tragic figure, which arranged the plot against his own will, worrying not about himself, but about the good of Russia. The role of Pahlen was played by Oleg Yankovsky, that of Paul - by Viktor Sukhorukov.

In 1928, Lewis Stone played Pahlen in The Patriot, starring Emil Jannings as Paul I. This film is considered lost, although fragments of it still exist in the UCLA Film Archives.

References

Pahlen in literature
Pahlen in Sartre's 'Nausea'
Pahlen in the writing of John Quincy Adams
Pahlen in the writings of Thomas Jefferson

1745 births
1826 deaths
People from Haljala Parish
People from Kreis Wierland
Baltic German people from the Russian Empire
Nobility from the Russian Empire
House of Pahlen
Members of the State Council (Russian Empire)
Imperial Russian Army generals
Russian Empire regicides
Recipients of the Order of St. George of the Third Degree
Recipients of the Order of Saint Lazarus
Paul I of Russia